Harvester may refer to:

Agriculture and forestry
 Combine harvester, a machine commonly used to harvest grain crops
 Forage harvester, a machine used to harvest forage
 Harvester (forestry), a type of heavy vehicle employed in cut-to-length logging of trees
 International Harvester, a former agricultural machinery company

Information technology
 Harvester (web), a tool to download websites
 Harvester (HCI), an open-source hyper-converged infrastructure started in 2020 by SUSE
 Bioinformatic Harvester, a bioinformatic meta search engine

Music
 Harvester (band) or Träd, Gräs, och Stenar, a Swedish progressive band
 Harvester (American band), an American indie rock band
 The Harvesters (band), a Swedish alternative country band

Places
 Burr Ridge, Illinois or Harvester
 Harvester, Missouri, an unincorporated community in St. Charles County

Zoology
 Feniseca tarquinius or harvesters, a species of butterflies
 Miletinae or harvesters, a subfamily of butterflies
 Opiliones or harvesters, an order of arachnids superficially similar to spiders

Other uses
 The Harvesters (film), a 2018 film
 Harvester (horse), winner of the 1884 Epsom Derby
 The Harvesters (painting), a 1565 wood painting by Pieter Bruegel
 Harvester (restaurant), a British restaurant chain
 Harvester (video game), a 1996 computer adventure game
 The Harvester (1927 film), an American silent comedy film
 The Harvesters (Doctor Who), a 1968, Doctor Who adventure serial
 Harvesters (Ancher), a 1905 oil painting by Anna Ancher
 The Harvester, a 1936 American comedy film
 HMS Harvester (H19), an H-class destroyer launched as HMS Handy in 1939
 Harvester, a fictional large vehicle in the 1965 novel Dune by Frank Herbert (see Dune terminology) and Dune games

See also
 Harvester Judgment, a 1908 Australian High Court case that established the concept of a minimum wage
 HMS Harvester, a list of ships of the Royal Navy
 List of harvesters
 Theristai, a.k.a. Reapers or Harvesters, a lost satyr play by Euripides
 Energy harvesting